Saint-Oulph is a commune in the Aube department in north-central France with the post code 10170.

Inhabitants of Saint-Oulph are known as Saint-Ulphiens or Saint-Ulphiennes.

Population

The municipal population of Saint-Oluph was 287 as of 2017, with a population density of 26 inhabitants per km².

Geography 
Saint-Oulph is located in the Grand Est region  approximately a 2 hour and 15 minute drive South-East from Paris and is located on the East bank of the River Seine.

See also
Communes of the Aube department

References

Communes of Aube
Aube communes articles needing translation from French Wikipedia